Jenny Chuasiriporn (born Wanalee Chuasiriporn; July 9, 1977) is a former American professional golfer who finished second at the 1998 U.S. Women's Open. Born in Baltimore, Maryland, her parents were from Thailand.

1998 U.S. Open
After four rounds of play Chuasiriporn, playing as an amateur, was tied with Se Ri Pak for first place. With her brother Joey as her caddy, she sank a  birdie putt on the 72nd green on Sunday to gain a spot in the playoff.
 In the playoff round on Monday, Chuasiriporn lost on the 20th hole (second sudden-death hole after 18-hole playoff).

College career
After that performance, she returned to Duke University where she led the Blue Devils to the 1999 NCAA golf title.  Overall, she finished her college career as a four-time All-American and was entered into the Duke University Athletic Hall of Fame.

Amateur career
In addition to her 1998 U.S. Open success, Chuasiriporn was runner-up at the 1998 U.S. Women's Amateur.  Chuasiriporn was also a member of the 1998 Curtis Cup winning team.

Post-college career
Chuasiriporn played on various mini-tours after college. In 2005, she went back to college to study nursing at the University of Maryland. She received a master's degree from Virginia Commonwealth University and became a nurse practitioner in 2010. She lives in Virginia with her husband, physician Robert Betts, and practices under her legal name, Wanalee Betts.

Chuasiriporn was inducted into Duke's athletic hall of fame in 2011.

Playoff record
LPGA Tour playoff record (0–1)

U.S. national team appearances
Amateur
Curtis Cup: 1998 (winners)
Espirito Santo Trophy: 1998 (winners)

References

American female golfers
Duke Blue Devils women's golfers
Sportspeople from Baltimore
Sportspeople from Richmond, Virginia
1977 births
Living people